Karlanyurt (Qarlan-yurt; , Ġan-Yurt) is a rural locality (a selo) and the administrative centre of Karlanyurtovsky Selsoviet, Khasavyurtovsky District, Republic of Dagestan, Russia. The population was 3,335 as of 2010. There are 18 streets.

Geography 
Karlanyurt is located 11 km southeast of Khasavyurt (the district's administrative centre) by road. Petrakovskoye is the nearest rural locality.

References 

Rural localities in Khasavyurtovsky District